William Arthur Stickney (May 25, 1879 – September 12, 1944) was an American golfer who competed in the 1904 Summer Olympics. In 1904 he was part of the American team which won the silver medal. He finished 17th in this competition. In the individual competition he finished fourth in the qualification and was eliminated in the second round of the match play.

References

External links
 Profile

American male golfers
Amateur golfers
Golfers at the 1904 Summer Olympics
Olympic silver medalists for the United States in golf
Medalists at the 1904 Summer Olympics
1879 births
1932 deaths